Sébastian Menci (born 4 April 1975) is an Argentine cross-country skier. He competed in the men's 10 kilometre classical event at the 1992 Winter Olympics.

References

1975 births
Living people
Argentine male cross-country skiers
Olympic cross-country skiers of Argentina
Cross-country skiers at the 1992 Winter Olympics
Place of birth missing (living people)